Avraham is the Hebrew name of Abraham, patriarch of the Abrahamic religions.

Avraham may also refer to:
 Avraham (given name)
 Avraham (surname)

See also
 Abraham (disambiguation)
 Avram (disambiguation)
 Ibrahim (disambiguation)